Rupen River is a river in western India in Gujarat whose origin is Gir Forest. Its basin has a maximum length of 156 km. The total catchment area of the basin is 2500 sq. km.

References

Rivers of Gujarat
Rivers of India